Greater Bilbao (Basque: Bilboaldea, Spanish: Gran Bilbao) is an administrative division of the province of Biscay, in the Basque Country, Spain. It is one of the seven comarcas of Biscay and the most populated one. The capital city of Greater Bilbao is Bilbao.

Greater Bilbao is made by the municipalities situated along the Estuary of Bilbao which themselves form a conurbation, which metropolitan area is the fifth most populous in Spain.

Geography 

Greater Bilbao, or Bilboaldea, is located at the northwest of the province of Biscay, limiting with the comarcas of Enkarterri in the west, Mungialdea and Busturialdea in the east, Durangaldea in the southeast and Arratia-Nerbioi in the south. The Bay of Biscay limits at north.

Divisions 

 

Greater Bilbao can be divided into six subcomarcas or subregions:

 The city of Bilbao itself, comprising a single municipality but containing eight districts; earlier part of the Uribe region (merindad)
The left bank: Traditionally an industrial, port, and manufacturing zone. It includes Barakaldo, Sestao, Portugalete and Santurtzi; earlier part of a larger merindad of Enkarterri, other than Barakaldo which was part of Uribe
The right bank: A mainly residential area, including Erandio, Leioa, and the more affluent Getxo; earlier part of Uribe
The mining zone west of the left bank, where the main iron ore resources were located: Muskiz, Gallarta, Ortuella; earlier part of Enkarterri
Txoriherri, wide expansion zone north of Bilbao / east of the right bank, where the international airport and the University of the Basque Country are located; earlier part of Uribe 
Hego Uribe, south-east of Bilbao including Basauri, Galdakao and Arrigorriaga; earlier part of Uribe
Uribe-Kosta: the coastal area north of Getxo is being integrated into the metropolitan area in the recent years, with the development of low density residential areas connected by the metro; earlier part of Uribe, most of the municipalities in this zone belong to the Mungialdea comarca

Municipalities 

Greater Bilbao is divided into 25 municipalities, being Bilbao the capital city. The 25 municipalities, among with some others, make the Metropolitan Area of Bilbao.

See also 

 Bilbao metropolitan area
 Bilbao
 Bilbao la Vieja
 Biscay

References

External links 
 
Comarca del Gran Bilbao (Biscay Government).
 Comarca del Gran Bilbao
 Bilbao Ría 2000.
 Bilbao Metrópoli-30.

 
Populated coastal places in Spain
Comarcas of Biscay
Metropolitan areas of Spain
Estuary of Bilbao